Madurai Institute of Social Sciences, is a multi faculty research center located in Madurai, Tamil Nadu. The college is affiliated with Madurai Kamaraj University. This college offers different courses in social sciences. The college is first of its result in South India offering courses related to professional social work and Human Research Management.

Departments

English
Computer Science
Information Technology
Social Work
Business Administration
Commerce
Psychology

Accreditation
The college is  recognized by the University Grants Commission (UGC).
The college is Re-Accredited with  B+ Grade by NAAC

References

External links

Colleges affiliated to Madurai Kamaraj University
Universities and colleges in Madurai district
Universities and colleges in Madurai